Gerald Glatzmayer (14 December 1968 – 11 January 2001) was an Austrian footballer who took part in the 1990 World Cup.

Club career-
Born in Vienna, he mostly played professional football for local sides during his club career except for one season at Sankt Pölten. Making his debut at 17 years of age  at Austria, he also played for First Vienna, Admira Wacker and SV Schwechat. He finished his career at SV Göllersdorf.

International career
He made his debut for Austria in an August 1988 friendly match against Hungary and was a participant at the 1990 World Cup. He earned 6 caps, scoring 1 goal (against Malta in 1989). His last international was a June 1990 World Cup Finals match against the United States, Austria's final game at the tournament in which he came on as a late substitute for Gerhard Rodax.

International goal
Scores and results list Austria's goal tally first.

Death
Glatzmayer died in a car accident near Schwechat in January 2001.

Honours
Austrian Football Bundesliga (1):
 1986
Austrian Cup (1):
 1986

External links
Player profile - Austria Archiv

1968 births
2001 deaths
Footballers from Vienna
Austrian footballers
Austria international footballers
1990 FIFA World Cup players
FK Austria Wien players
First Vienna FC players
FC Admira Wacker Mödling players
Austrian Football Bundesliga players
Road incident deaths in Austria
Association football midfielders
Favoritner AC players